Desmiphora auatinga is a species of beetle in the family Cerambycidae. It was described by Martins and Galileo in 1996. It is known from El Oro: Machala Ecuador.

References

Desmiphora
Beetles described in 1996